Areca concinna is a species of flowering plant in the family Arecaceae. It is found only in Sri Lanka. It is threatened by habitat loss.

References

concinna
Flora of Sri Lanka
Endangered plants
Taxonomy articles created by Polbot